The Biomedical Research Council (Abbreviation: BMRC) is a research council in Singapore, established in October 2000. This research council supports, oversees and coordinates public sector biomedical research and development activities in Singapore. The Council works in close partnership with the Economic Development Board’s (EDB) Biomedical Sciences Group and Bio*One Capital.

References

External links
A*star website

2000 establishments in Singapore
Science and technology in Singapore
Scientific organisations based in Singapore
Medical and health organisations based in Singapore
Organizations established in 2000